HP: To the Highest Level Na! is a Philippine television situational comedy series broadcast by GMA Network. Starring Bong Revilla, Jr., it premiered on October 1, 2005 on the network's KiliTV line up. The series concluded on July 14, 2007 with a total of 92 episodes.

Premise
Abel is a single father and secret agent who handles cases that verge on the paranormal, and Candy is a witch who renounces her powers to live among mortals.

Cast and characters

Lead cast
 Bong Revilla as Abel

Supporting cast
 Rufa Mae Quinto as Candy
 Leo Martinez as Boss Hugo
 K Brosas as Toni
 Jolo Revilla as Joko
 Yasmien Kurdi as Jackie
 Rainier Castillo as Prince
 Antonio Aquitania as Caloy
 Diego Llorico as Diday

References

External links
 

2005 Philippine television series debuts
2007 Philippine television series endings
Filipino-language television shows
GMA Network original programming
Philippine comedy television series